Rita Jean Taggart is an American film and television actress. She is known for playing Carla Bouvier on Night Court.

Biography
Taggart was the third wife of cinematographer Haskell Wexler from 1989 until his death at age 93 in 2015.

On television, Taggart portrayed Blanche on Steambath, Marie Roscini in Hello, Larry, Diane in Eye to Eye, and Joan Foley in Almost Grown. Her TV acting credits included guest role appearances on such shows as Rhoda, Taxi, Kate & Allie, Scarecrow and Mrs. King, Quantum Leap, Coach, and Cagney and Lacey.

Her film credits include the made-for-TV movie James Dean (1976), Coming Home (1978), The China Syndrome (1979) and the TV movie Wait Till Your Mother Gets Home! (1983). She has most recently appeared in the films Circle in 2010 and Go for Sisters in 2013.

Films

Feature films

Television films

Partial television credits

References

External links
 
 Rita Taggart Biography  - Film Reference.com

American film actresses
American television actresses
Actresses from California
San Francisco State University alumni
People from Salinas, California
Living people
20th-century American actresses
21st-century American actresses
Year of birth missing (living people)